Yosuke Hatakeyama (born 28 July 1980) is a Japanese skier. He competed in the Nordic combined event at the 2006 Winter Olympics.

References

1980 births
Living people
Japanese male Nordic combined skiers
Olympic Nordic combined skiers of Japan
Nordic combined skiers at the 2006 Winter Olympics
Sportspeople from Akita Prefecture